The Chase or Zhui Ji（追撃), released in North America and worldwide as The Shanghai Killers, is a 1971 Hong Kong action film with sword fighting directed by Wong Tin Lam. It stars Maria Yi and James Tien.

The film entered the North American box office charts in August 1973, before eventually topping the chart in September. It briefly overtook the Bruce Lee film Enter the Dragon, before it regained the top spot several weeks later.

Cast
Maria Yi Dut
James Tien Chun
Gam Saan
Fong Sam
Wu Jiaxiang
Tang Ching
Yam Ho
Cheung Hei
Lee Man Tai
Chai Lin Fui
Jason Pai Piao

References

External links
 The Chase (1971 film) at HKcinemamagic.com
 

1971 films
Hong Kong action films
1971 action films
1970s Mandarin-language films
Films directed by Wong Tin-lam
1970s Hong Kong films